The Myangad people live in Myangad sum of Khovd Province, Mongolia.

References

Mongol peoples
Mongols
Ethnic groups in Mongolia
Oirats
Dzungar Khanate